Ankara Hacı Bayram Veli University, shortened AHBV, is a public university in Turkey which was formed on 18 May 2018 by the separation from Gazi University. Some faculties which have been separated from Gazi University in accordance with the law no 7141 such as Gazi University Faculty of Law, Faculty of Economics and Administrative Sciences, Faculty of Letters have been become a part of newly established Ankara Hacı Bayram Veli University. The Besevler Campus is located in the city center of Ankara, the capital city of Turkey. Besevler Campus, which has the Faculty of Law and Faculty of Economics and Administrative Sciences, has graduated many famous people who are active in Turkish politics. Kemal Kılıçdaroğlu of the Republican People's Party, the leader of the main opposition party in the Turkish Grand National Assembly, and Devlet Bahçeli, the leader of the Nationalist Movement Party, have graduated from the aforementioned Faculty of Economics and Administrative Sciences.

See also
 List of universities in Ankara
 List of universities in Turkey

References

Universities and colleges in Ankara